Stereospermum neuranthum is the accepted name of an Asian tree species in the family Bignoniaceae.  It is found in sub-tropical and tropical seasonal forests up to 1600 m in: southern China, northeast India, Myanmar, Thailand, Cambodia, Laos and Vietnam.  Names include quao núi (also: ké núi, quao núi quả bốn cạnh) in Viet Nam; in China it is called 毛叶羽叶楸 mao ye yu ye qiu.

References

External links

EoL: Stereospermum neuranthum (accessed 3/7/2017)
IPNI: Stereospermum neuranthum (accessed 3/7/2017)

neuranthum
Trees of Vietnam
Flora of Indo-China
Lamiales of Asia